Palasdari (formerly Padusdhurree, station code: PDI) is a railway station on the Central line of the Mumbai Suburban Railway network.

It is also on Karjat–Lonavala line. On Khopoli route Kelavli is the next station.

Railway stations in Raigad district
Karjat-Khopoli rail line
Mumbai Suburban Railway stations
Kalyan-Lonavala rail line